The first cabinet of Thorbjörn Fälldin was the cabinet and Government of Sweden from 8 October 1976 to 18 October 1978.

The cabinet was a coalition majority government consisting the Centre Party, the Liberal People's Party and the Moderate Party. The cabinet was led by Prime Minister Thorbjörn Fälldin of the Centre Party who had led his party to victory in the 1976 general election.

The cabinet resigned on 18 October 1978 following discord in the area involving nuclear power. The cabinet was succeeded by Ola Ullsten's First Cabinet.

Ministers 

|}

External links
The Government and the Government Offices of Sweden

1976 establishments in Sweden
Cabinets of Sweden
Politics of Sweden
1978 disestablishments in Sweden
Cabinets established in 1976
Cabinets disestablished in 1978